Quaiser Khalid is an officer of the Indian Police Service, who served as the Commissioner of Police, Railways, Mumbai. He is 1997 batch IPS officer having wide experience in law and order management, crime control, anti-insurgency operations, mega city policing, traffic management, Human Resource management etc. He has been trained in India and abroad especially Charles Stuart University, Australia and University College of London. He is a noted Public Speaker and has taken many sessions on Motivation, Career Counselling, Security, Police Work, Etc. He is also a poet of  Urdu and Hindi languages. He has written two anthologies of Urdu poetry, consisting of ghazals and nazms, and is the recipient of the Maharashtra State Urdu Sahitya Academy Award.

Career

Khalid started his career as a trainee Assistant Superintendent of Police in Solapur rural police district of Maharashtra. He has served in Jalgaon, Gadchiroli, Sindhudurg, Wardha districts as Assistant/ Additional/ Superintendent of Police. He has also worked as Commanding Officer of State Reserve Police Force Group eleven Navi Mumbai and Group Four at Nagpur. He was instrumental in the creation of the India Reserve Battalion ( SRPF Group 15, Aurangabad). He has served as Deputy Commissioner of Police, Railways Central Zone, Deputy Commissioner of Police Port Zone, Additional Commissioner of police east region, Mumbai, Additional Commissioner of Police, Traffic, Mumbai, Additional Commissioner of Police Local Armed, Mumbai, officiating Managing Director, Maharashtra State Security Corporation and Inspector General of Police, Crime against weaker sections, women and children. Currently he is serving as Commissioner of Police Railways Mumbai.

Poetry

In 2005 Khalid edited and published the poetry collection of Urdu poet Syed Ali Mohammad Shaad Azimabadi. His first anthology, titled ‘Shawoore Asr’ (The consciousness of times) was published in 2014 and led to Khalid being awarded the Maharashtra state Urdu Sahitya Academy Award in 2015. This book was commented upon internationally

His second book Dashte Jaa'n (The Wilderness of Soul) was also published in 2014.

Pasbaan-e-Adab

Quaiser Khalid is the founder-president of the non-profit and literary NGOs Pasbaan-e-adab, Mumbai and Jashn-e-Adab, New Delhi which organizes literary and cultural events in Indian languages especially Urdu Hindi and Marathi in various parts of the country.
These organizations organized the following events:
 Anubhuti – The Hindi Literature Festival.
 Izhaar – The International Poetry Festival in Urdu.
 Kaavyanjali – The Marathi Poetry Festival
 Meeraas – The Heritage, An event of soulful Hindustani Poetry and Music
 Sahitya Utsav – The Festival of Indian Art and Literature and Culture in New Delhi and other North-Indian cities.

Books
 Shaoor-e-Asr (2014) 
 Dasht-e-Jaa.n (2016) 
 Deewane-Shaad Azeemabadi (2004)(editor)

Award
Maharashtra State Urdu Sahitya Academy Award

Social initiatives
Khalid is working for improving the capability of students from under-privileged sections of the society. He is actively associated with anti-drug campaigns.

Quaiser Khalid, with his entire Mumbai Railway Police team, started an initiative 'Plasma Connect' to connect the Plasma Donors with the needy when Plasma Therapy was considered to help the patients.

During the Covid-19 pandemic, Quaiser Khalid in association with his NGO Pasbaan-e-adab started providing free oxygen cylinders, community fridges, food, and other variants of assistance to the needy when needed.

References 

Urdu-language poets
Indian male poets
1971 births
Living people
21st-century Indian poets
21st-century Indian male writers